Simon Lian Chen-hsiang (born January 3, 1992), also known as Simon Lien or Lien Chen-hsiang, is a Taiwanese actor and singer. He was a member of the Taiwanese boyband SpeXial from 2014 to 2017.

Biography
Lian Chenxiang was born in Shulin District, New Taipei City on January 3, 1992. He attended and graduated from Ming Chuan University with a degree in economics. On May 14, 2014, he became a member of the Taiwanese boyband SpeXial after being scouted while working in a clothing store. Lian debuted in SpeXial under its English name of "Simon" on June 5, during the press conference of the group's second album, Break It Down.

Along with several of his bandmates, he participated in the 2016 costume drama series Men with Sword. On November 4, 2016, he dropped his studies at the National Taiwan University of Arts in order to prepare for his mandatory military service. Lian continued working with the group until December 11, after a press conference for the series High 5 Basketball.

On January 25, 2017, he announced on his personal Facebook account that he had requested the termination of his contract with Comic International Productions due to "unclear accounts", and that he intended to leave SpeXial. He officially left the group on February 2, 2017. Lian was the first member to ever leave SpeXial, and was soon followed by bandmate Zhiwei, who left the group a month later, on March 23.

Discography

EP

Filmography

Film

Television

Web series

References

External links 
 Official web site

1992 births
Living people
Taiwanese male television actors
Taiwanese male film actors
Taiwanese male models
21st-century Taiwanese male actors
21st-century Taiwanese male singers
Taiwanese Mandopop singers
Taiwanese pop singers
Taiwanese idols